The Academy of Experts (TAE; formerly the British Academy of Experts) is a UK legal institute for expert witnesses. It was founded in 1987 with the objective of providing a professional body for experts to establish and promote high objective standards.

Although there is representation on the Academy’s Council from the legal profession the majority of the officers, including the Chairman, are practising Experts.

The President of The Academy is currently Lord Saville of Newdigate. Past Presidents include the UK politician and former Chancellor of the Exchequer Geoffrey Howe and Gordon Slynn, Baron Slynn of Hadley.

As a multi-disciplinary body TAE works with professional bodies around the world advising and supporting their Expert Witness practices. In partnership with the Institute of Chartered Accountants in England and Wales TAE publishes the Register of Accredited Accountant Expert Witnesses.

The association awards four grades of membership the highest of which is Fellowship, which entitles the holder to use the post nominal letters FAE.

Standards 
In 2005 the Code of Practice for Experts was endorsed for by the Master of the Rolls, Lord Phillips of Worth Matravers. The code is cited in the Northern Ireland Rules on Expert Evidence PD 1 of 2015.

References 

Legal organisations based in the United Kingdom
Evidence law
Organizations established in 1987